The Quart Festival was an annual popular music festival that took place in Kristiansand, Norway in the beginning of July, from 1991 to 2008. It was the most visited music festival in Norway.

It was first named Qvadradurmusivalen in 1991, but changed into the more ear-catching Quart Festival the following year. For several years Quart was the largest music festival in Norway, but went bankrupt in 2008 in part due to tough competition from the Hovefestivalen in Arendal and some Oslo-based festivals.

Scandals
There have been some scandals during the years. 
A local band Flying Crap fired a shotgun from the stage in 1995.
Marilyn Manson ripped a bible on stage in 1999.
The Kovenant burned a bible on stage in 2000.
Mayhem threw pigs' heads at the audience in 2001.
Eight musicians from hiphop group Equicez were arrested for drug offences in 2003.
Kristopher Schau attached an engine to a dead pig and used it as a boat in 2003.
Two persons from rainforest charity group Fuck For Forest had live sex on stage during a concert with The Cumshots in 2004.

2008 cancelling and bankruptcy
On the evening of 6 June, citing low ticket sales (14,000 against a budget of 30,000), the festival management officially decided to cancel the 2008 festival (due to start on 1 July) and as well file the managing company for bankruptcy. Following the 2007 festival, the company had a deficiency of roughly 16 million kroner.

2009 – The festival returns
The Quart Festival was revived by one of the original organisers and was held on 30 June to 4 July 2009. Slash's performance was backed by Teddy Andreadis, Jason Bonham, Chris Cheney, John 5 and Frankie Perez, and included guest performances from Ozzy Osbourne, Ronnie Wood and Fergie.

The festival was an economic disaster with low attendances and slow revenues. The festival was by mid-September 2009 still not able to pay their employees and is now threatened by bankruptcy.

Key performers
1992: Spiritualized, The Boo Radleys, Tom Russell, Bel Canto, Pogo Pops, Black Press,

1993: Motorpsycho, Seigmen, 808 State

1994: Elvis Costello, The Orb, Blur, Elastica

1995: The Black Crowes, Weezer, Lisa Germano, Morphine

1996: Motorpsycho, Nick Cave and the Bad Seeds, Pulp, Ministry, Orbital, Underworld, Beck, Massive Attack, Black Grape

1997: Rage Against the Machine, Suede, Einstürzende Neubauten, Daft Punk, Aphex Twin, The Charlatans

1998: Beastie Boys, Portishead, Björk, Iggy Pop, Tori Amos, Teenage Fanclub, Wyclef Jean

1999: The Roots, Fatboy Slim, Happy Mondays, Garbage, Marilyn Manson, Blur, Massive Attack, The Cardigans, Skunk Anansie

2000: Sonic Youth, Oasis, Leftfield, Moby, Death in Vegas, Morten Abel, Madrugada, Nine Inch Nails, Counting Crows, Macy Gray

2001: Manic Street Preachers, Deftones, Beck, Alanis Morissette, PJ Harvey, The Dandy Warhols, Motörhead, Coldplay, Wyclef Jean, Mayhem

2002: David Bowie, Travis, Rammstein, No Doubt, Morten Abel, Belle and Sebastian, Turbonegro, Kent, …And You Will Know Us by the Trail of Dead, Jon Spencer Blues Explosion, Kaizers Orchestra, Muse, White Stripes

2003: Massive Attack, Nas, Coldplay, The Flaming Lips, Queens of the Stone Age, Röyksopp, The Cardigans, Immortal, Mew, Tumi And The Volume

2004: Alicia Keys, The Black Eyed Peas, Sean Paul, The Darkness, Morrissey, Pixies, Franz Ferdinand, The Hives, !!!, Phoenix, Pleasure, The Cumshots, Slipknot, N.E.R.D.

2005: Audioslave, Green Day, Foo Fighters, Jimmy Eat World, Snoop Dogg, Thomas Dybdahl, The Game, Porcupine Tree, Stonegard, Fantômas

2006: Depeche Mode, Tool, Kanye West, Muse, Pharrell, Arctic Monkeys, Damian Marley, Devin the Dude, Placebo, Rufus Wainwright, Opeth, The Raconteurs, Wolfmother, Richard Hawley, Gogol Bordello, Flogging Molly, The Cat Empire, Death Cab for Cutie

2007: Turbonegro, The Who, Scissor Sisters, 50 Cent, BigBang, Chris Cornell, Motorpsycho, Black Debbath, The Roots, Mew, Talib Kweli

2009: Marilyn Manson, John 5, Slash, Ozzy Osbourne, Young Jeezy, The Black Eyed Peas, Placebo, Korn, Chris Cornell

Quart 1996 booking (as seen on official poster)
Headliners: Nick Cave and the Bad Seeds, Pulp, Ministry, Massive Attack, Coolio, Orbital, Leftfield, Underworld, Beck, Black Grape

Goldie/Metalheadz, The Presidents of the USA, Foo Fighters, The Amps, The Chemical Brothers, The Roots, Ocean Colour Scene, Fear Factory, Slayer, GZA, The Mike Flowers Pops

Ken Ishii, Nightmares on Wax, BT, Faithless, Lionrock, Moloko, Ash, Nicolette, Spring Heel Jack, Dog Eat Dog, Whipping Boy, Dirty Three, The Brotherhood, Morcheeba, Fun Lovin' Criminals, Hallucinogen, Super Furry Animals, Bis, Motorpsycho, Peltz, The Highrollers, Penthouse Playboys, Palace of Pleasure, Folk & Røvere, Gartnerlosjen, Turbonegro, Subgud, Kåre and the Cavemen, The 3rd and the Mortal, Alania, Tørst, Salida, Gluecifer, Mindstate, Red Cloud, Dryads, Silent, Ad Libitum, Groms, The Weeds, Cirkus Gilmour, Whipped Cream Royale.

25th anniversary festival
28 and 29 June 2016, the Quart Festival will be revived at Odderøya.  The occasion is the 25th anniversary since the first festival.  The organisers promise major Norwegian and International names.

Quart 2000 line-up

Quart 2001 line-up

References

External links
Official site (mostly in Norwegian)
Official Site: English (Limited pages)
Latest festival news (English)
fastest festival news (English)

Kristiansand
Culture in Agder
Rock festivals in Norway
Recurring events established in 1991
1991 establishments in Norway